Sacerdoti is an Italian surname. Notable people with the surname include:

 Jonathan Sacerdoti,  British journalist
 Piero Sacerdoti (1905–1966), Italian insurer and university professor, general manager of Riunione Adriatica di Sicurtà
 Tod Sacerdoti

Italian-language surnames